José María Alfaro Zamora (March 20, 1799 – June 12, 1856) was the Costa Rican Head of State between the periods of 1842 and 1844 as well as 1846 and 1847 and President of Costa Rica between May 1 and May 8, 1847.

Early life and family 
Alfaro was born in Alajuela, Costa Rica on March 20, 1799 to his parents Juan Antonio Alfaro y Arias and María Damiana Zamora y Flores. On May 19, 1825 he married María Josefa Sandoval y Jiménez. With her he fathered José Joaquín Alfaro Sandoval, a daughter who died early in her childhood, and Calixto Alfaro Sandoval.

Alfaro was a farmer and a businessman. He owned lands devoted to coffee plantation and a sawmill in Itiquís near Alajuela. He also participated in a lumber company in Jinotepe, Nicaragua.

Public activities 
He served as supply deputy for Alajuela (1825-1827), second mayor of Alajuela (1828), deputy for Alajuela (1829-1831), deputy for Heredia (1834-1836), political leader of the western department (1841) and magistrate of the Judicial Chamber (1841-1842).

On September 27, 1842, in a junta convocated by then Head of State Antonio Pinto Soares, José María Alfaro Zamora was designated Provisional Head of State. During his administration he built the road that connects San José to Puntarenas, founded Universidad de Santo Tomás, emitted the 1844 Constitution, and founded the newspaper "Mentor Costarricense". He lost the 1844 elections to Francisco María Oreamuno Bonilla. On November 29, 1844 he gave Oreamuno his office which was meant to last until 1848.

On June 7, 1846 after a coup d'état Alfaro was again declared Provisional Head of State. During this administration Puntarenas was declared a free port, the 1847 Constitution was emitted and a failed diplomatic mission with Nicaragua was launched in a second attempt to sign a border agreement with this country (a previous attempt by Braulio Carrillo in 1838 had also failed). Although he lost the 1847 elections to José María Castro Madriz he won the office of Vice President for the next term.

In order to comply with the new Constitution, from May 1 to May 8, 1847 he used the title President of the State. On May 8, 1847 he was succeeded by Castro. In May 1847, he became Vice President of the State, but he had to quit months after. Accused of corruption, he was confined to Térraba and later moved to Panama.

Aftermath and death 

He later returned to Costa Rica but refused to participate in politics. He died in Alajuela on June 11, 1856 due to cholera.

References 

1799 births
1856 deaths
People from Alajuela
Costa Rican people of Spanish descent
Presidents of Costa Rica
Vice presidents of Costa Rica
Leaders who took power by coup
Deaths from cholera
Infectious disease deaths in Costa Rica
Mayors of places in Costa Rica
Members of the Legislative Assembly of Costa Rica
19th-century Costa Rican judges
Costa Rican liberals